CRN, or crn, may refer to:

Business
 CRN International, an American radio marketing company
 CRN S.p.A, a luxury yacht brand owned by the Ferretti Group
 Cornell Companies, a defunct American private prison company
 Congress Rental Network, an audiovisual technology trade association
 Council for Responsible Nutrition, an American dietary supplement trade association

Media
 CRN (magazine), an American technology trade magazine
 CRN Digital Talk Radio Networks, an American radio network
 Calvary Radio Network, a radio station network in the United States
 Community Radio Network (Australia), a radio program distributor
 Community Radio Network (New Zealand), a radio network

Politics
 National Reconciliation Committee (Comité de réconciliation nationale), a Malagasy political coalition founded by Albert Zafy
 National Reconciliation Council (Niger) (Conseil de réconciliation nationale), a governing body during the Fourth Republic of Niger
 National Revolutionary Committee (Comité Revolucionario Nacional), a participant in the Jaca uprising in Spain

Science
 CrN, a lattice constant in physics
 Chemical reaction network, in mathematical chemistry
 Chromium nitride, a chemical compound
 Common Random Numbers, a statistical procedure
 Concentration ratio, a measure of market concentration in economics
 Cross-polytope of n-dimensions, in geometry
 US Climate Reference Network, a network of climate stations in the United States
 Neurosciences Research Center (Centre de recherche en neurosciences), a research organization at Université Laval, Québec, Canada

Technology
 CRN 91 Naval Gun, an Indian naval autocannon
 AN/CRN, a series of United States military radio transmitters
 Cognos ReportNet, business intelligence software

Transportation
 Community Rail Network, a British rail association
 Country Regional Network, a rail network in New South Wales, Australia
 CRN, the Amtrak code for Creston (Amtrak station), Iowa, US
 CRN, the ICAO code for Aero Caribbean, merged into Cubana in 2015
 CRN, the ICAO code for Carson Air Ltd, a Canadian air ambulance operator
 CRN, the National Rail code for Crowthorne railway station, Berkshire, UK
 CRN, the reporting mark for the Carolina and Northwestern Railway, US

Other uses
 Canadian Registration Number, in Canadian boiler safety regulation
 Certified Radiologic Nurse, a nursing certification
 Chinese Rainbow Network, an LGBT-related organization in China
 Conflict Risk Network, a program of the defunct Genocide Intervention Network
 Cora language, an indigenous language of Mexico

See also